Leucopogon incisus is a species of flowering plant in the heath family Ericaceae and is endemic to a small area in the far south of the south-west of Western Australia. It is a delicate, erect or sprawling shrub with glabrous young branchlets, spirally arranged, erect, narrowly egg-shaped to narrowly elliptic leaves, and white or pale pink, narrowly bell-shaped to more or less cylindrical flowers.

Description

Taxonomy and naming
Leucopogon incisus was first formally described in 2015 by Michael Clyde Hislop in the journal Nuytsia from specimens he collected in the Blackwood River National Park in 2014. The specific epithet (incisus) means "cut deeply and sharply", referring to the deeply notched tip of the fruit.

Distribution and habitat
This leucopogon is only known from a small area of jarrah woodland where it grows in winter-wet sandy soil in he far south of the Jarrah Forest bioregion of south-western Western Australia.

Conservation status
Leucopogon incisus is listed as "Priority Two" by the Western Australian Government Department of Biodiversity, Conservation and Attractions, meaning that it is poorly known and from only one or a few locations.

References

incisus
Ericales of Australia
Flora of Western Australia
Plants described in 2015